The North Queensland Register was a newspaper published in Charters Towers, Queensland, Australia from 15 June 1892 to 30 March 1984.

The paper was formerly known as the North Queensland herald and Northern mining register. It was also nicknamed the Bushman's Bible.

Digitisation 
The paper has been digitised as part of the Australian Newspapers Digitisation Program of the National Library of Australia.

References

External links

 
 

Defunct newspapers published in Queensland
Newspapers established in 1892
Publications disestablished in 1984
1892 establishments in Australia
Charters Towers
1984 disestablishments in Australia